Petko Petkov may refer to:

 (born 1942), see World Championship of Chess Composition
Petko Petkov (footballer) (1946−2020), Bulgarian football player and manager
Petko Petkov (football manager) (born 1968), Bulgarian  football manager and former player
 Petko Petkov (volleyball) (born 1958), Bulgarian former volleyball player

See also
Petkov (surname)